Joy Westmore (13 March 1932 – 5 November 2020) was an Australian actress on radio, stage and television, and in voice-over. She was best known to local and international television viewers for her long-running role in Prisoner as the friendly but highly ineffectual bespectacled officer Joyce Barry, appearing from the first season in 1979 until the final episode in 1986 and smaller roles in Neighbours in 1991 and 2003.

Career
Westmore had been an actress since 1950. She read commercials on radio and was particularly known for her performances opposite Barry Humphries's alter ego Dame Edna Everage. She also appeared in early television comedy sketches with Graham Kennedy and Ernie Sigley. She made her small-screen debut in the TV movie The Sentimental Bloke, and subsequently had roles in the soap The Sullivans and in Bellbird, before taking on the longer-lasting role of Officer Joyce Barry in Prisoner. She was a recurring cast member throughout the first five years of the show, but became a regular in 1984 and continued until the series' finale in 1986. Entertainment reporter Peter Ford stated that "Joyce Barry was probably the world's worst prison officer, because she was too overly nice and trustworthy, although she provided a lot of comic relief in the series".

After Prisoner she played Mrs Blanche White in an Australian version of the TV game show Cluedo, and had two brief roles in Neighbours, as Mrs Forster in 1991 and as Dee Bliss's grandmother, Nancy Bliss, in 2003. She also played various small roles in one-off and long-running dramas, including Waiting at the Royal, Fergus McPhail and Blue Heelers.

Personal life and death
Westmore was married to dentist Brian Westmore on 13 March 1960, the same day as her 28th birthday. They had four children together.

Joy Westmore died from dementia in an aged care facility in Melbourne, Victoria, on 5 November 2020, aged 88.

Filmography

Awards
 Penguin Award – Joyce Barry in Prisoner

References

External links
 

Australian film actresses
1932 births
2020 deaths
Australian soap opera actresses
20th-century Australian actresses
21st-century Australian actresses